Eureka Valley station is an abandoned underground streetcar station in San Francisco, California. It was located inside the Twin Peaks Tunnel, very close to its eastern end in the Eureka Valley neighborhood. The station opened in 1918, and was closed in 1972 during the construction of the Market Street subway.

History

During early planning of the municipal transit system, Eureka Valley station was positioned to serve as a transfer station to the Sunset Tunnel, whose east portal was originally to be located at the corner of Market and Eureka streets. The station had low platforms, with a single staircase on each platform leading to small headhouses on either side of Market Street. It opened with the Twin Peaks Tunnel on February 3, 1918; the Sunset Tunnel was built a decade later with an east portal at Duboce and Noe instead. Just east of the station, the tunnel dipped sharply (to connect to a planned Market Street tunnel) then rose to the surface at Castro Street.

When the Market Street subway was under construction, Forest Hill station was retained and years later upgraded to Muni Metro standards with high platforms, but Eureka Valley station was not. Plagued by high crime due to its low ridership and bent staircases, it was "a place as dangerous as any in the city." The station was permanently closed in 1972, and "temporary" ramps to the surface were built through the east end of the platforms, allowing construction of the new tunnel while maintaining existing streetcar service (on 17th Street, Church, and Duboce).

Cars on the K, L, and M lines began using temporary trackage on 17th Street on December 2, 1972, though the ramps were not completed until 1973. After eight years of construction, Castro station opened slightly to the east in 1980 when Muni Metro service was inaugurated on the three Twin Peaks Tunnel lines. The ramps remained in regular service on weekends until September 19, 1982, when the last PCC streetcar service was discontinued, however they continued to provide the only access from the maintenance yards near  Balboa Park Station  for   early historic streetcar service on Market Street until the extension of the J Church line to Balboa Park Station was completed in 1991.

After its closure, Eureka Valley station continued to attract illicit activity like parties and sex; Muni removed the decrepit headhouses in February 1980, and the station was more tightly secured with fences and doors. The fenced-off ramps are still used for overnight maintenance access; they are not regularly used by trains but are still present in Muni's train control system. The remaining platforms - the Bay Area's only ghost station - can be seen from passing trains, and the former stairwells serve as emergency exits that lead to hatches on the sidewalks outside. Planned renovations of the Twin Peak Tunnel include seismic retrofitting of the former station.

References

External links

 
 

Former Muni Metro stations
Abandoned rapid transit stations
Railway stations in the United States opened in 1918
Railway stations closed in 1972
Railway stations located underground in California